Lesedi Local Municipality is an administrative area in the Sedibeng District of Gauteng in South Africa.

Heidelberg is the seat of the municipality. During the first war of independence, Heidelberg served as capital of the South African Republic, from 1880 to 1883.

Lesedi is a Sesotho word meaning "light". The name was decided upon because the municipality represents the light of the area.

Politics 

The municipal council consists of twenty-six members elected by mixed-member proportional representation. Thirteen councillors are elected by first-past-the-post voting in thirteen wards, while the remaining thirteen are chosen from party lists so that the total number of party representatives is proportional to the number of votes received. In the election of 1 November 2021 the African National Congress (ANC) won a plurality of seats on the council. 

The planned abolition of the Lesedi, and its absorption into Ekurhuleni after the 2016 municipal elections, was blocked by the High Court of South Africa in 2015. 

The following table shows the results of the 2021 election.

Main places

The 2001 census divided the municipality into the following main places:

Management
In 2021 The Hawks arrested Mr Tshepo Malekana, development and planning manager at the municipality, for allegedly defrauding the municipality by selling vacant municipal land unlawfully and illegally between 2017 and 2019. He allegedly received cash payments totaling R100 million.

References

External links
 Lesedi Local Municipality

Local municipalities of the Sedibeng District Municipality